Behm is a surname (including a list of people with the name).

Behm may also refer to:

 Behm Bank, an undersea bank in the Weddell Sea
 Behm Canal, in the United States
 Behm River, in Australia

See also
 Boehm, a surname (including a list of people with the name)
 Böhm, a surname (including a list of people with the name)
 Böhme (disambiguation)
 Bohm (disambiguation)